This is a list of the Iceland national football team results from 1946 to 1959. Only games against full national sides are counted.

1940s

1946

1947

1948

1949

1950s

1951

1953

1954

1955

1956

References

Iceland national football team results
1940s in Iceland
1950s in Iceland